Khalaf Beygluy-e Sofla (also Romanized as Khalaf Beyglūy-e Soflá; also known as Halāk Beyglū, Khalaf Beyglū, and Khalaf Beyglū-ye Pā'īn) is a village in Garamduz Rural District, Garamduz District, Khoda Afarin County, East Azerbaijan Province, Iran. At the 2006 census, its population was 161, in 36 families.

See also

References 

Populated places in Khoda Afarin County